Marc-Aurèle de Foy Suzor-Coté  (April 6, 1869 – January 29, 1937) was a French Canadian painter and sculptor. He was one of the first native-born Canadian artists whose works were directly influenced by French Impressionism and Post-Impressionism.

Biography
He was born in Arthabaska, Quebec in 1869 and his father was an artist. Suzor-Coté studied at the Collège du Sacré-Coeur, Arthabaska. He was a baritone, who studied music at the Conservatory of Music in Paris in 1890, but later in the 1890s, studied painting and sculpture at the École des Beaux-Arts with Léon Bonnat. At the school, he learned of the work of Swedish sculptor Carl Milles whose sculptures of indigenous people influenced him. Three years later, after a visit home, he studied painting and sculpture at the Julian and Colarossi Academies. He exhibited his first works in 1894 at the Salon de la Société des Artistes Français. His first fully Impressionist paintings, with broken brushwork and bright colour, were made in Brittany in 1906.

After his return to Quebec in 1908, he established a studio in Montreal creating paintings with classic interpretations of Canadian landscapes. He produced many Impressionist and even Post-Impressionist paintings of the Quebec landscape, as well as portraits, nudes, historical paintings and later, sculptures. In his paintings, he was most interested in the play of light on snow and water, leaving behind optical truth for visual innovations. 

He was made an Officer of the Academy of France in 1901 – an honour for a Canadian artist. He was also made a member of the Royal Canadian Academy of Arts and joined the progressive Canadian Art Club. There were numerous exhibitions of his work during his lifetime and afterwards such as the retrospective of his work organized by the Quebec government in 1929. In 2002, Suzor-Coté, 1869-1937: Light and Matter, co-organized by the Musée du Québec and the National Gallery of Canada, was circulated by the Musée du Québec. This first major retrospective of Suzor-Coté, the first in 75 years, brought together over 140 works.

Suzor-Coté became paralyzed in 1927. In 1929, Suzor-Côté moved to Daytona Beach, Florida, where he died on 29 January 1937.

Recognition
On 14 March 1969 Canada Post issued stamps based on Suzor-Coté's painting Return from the Harvest Field (1903) in the National Gallery of Canada, Ottawa, Ontario. The 13-perforated 50¢ stamps with the inscription 'Suzor-Coté, 1869-1937' were printed by Canadian Bank Note Company, Limited.

Selected works
He produced forty or fifty small bronze Impressionist figures and groups. As of 2020, the Suzor-Coté collection in Ottawa's National Gallery of Canada consists of twenty-eight paintings, ten sculptures and a number of drawings. Return from the Harvest Field was acquired by the National Gallery in 1904. Other Suzor-Coté works in Canada are to be found in Quebec City's Musée national des beaux-arts, the RiverBrink Art Museum, and in private collections.

Gallery

References

Bibliography

External links

Canadian Sculpture: Coming of Age
 Suzor-Coté Chantre de la Nouvelle-France

1869 births
1937 deaths
19th-century Canadian painters
Canadian male painters
20th-century Canadian painters
Sculptors from Quebec
Canadian Impressionist painters
Impressionist sculptors
Academic art
Canadian alumni of the École des Beaux-Arts
Académie Julian alumni
Académie Colarossi alumni
Members of the Royal Canadian Academy of Arts
20th-century sculptors
19th-century sculptors
19th-century Canadian male artists
20th-century Canadian male artists